Dexter Gilman Wansel (born August 22, 1950) is an American R&B/jazz fusion singer, arranger, musician, composer, conductor, synthesist and A&R director.

Early life
Dexter Wansel began as an errand boy backstage at the Uptown Theater in Philadelphia from 1959 through 1963 for his step-uncle Georgie Woods. There he met many great artists who encouraged him to pursue music. During high school, he and his friend, Stanley Clarke, performed in bands together.

Career
In 1970 after being honourably discharged from the United States Army, Wansel quietly joined the ranks of synthesists like Wendy Carlos and Dick Hyman, where he began programming the EMS VCS 3 'Putney' and the ARP 2600 for sessions at Sigma Sound Studios both credited and uncredited. From the early to mid '70s, Wansel also played keyboards for groups such as Instant Funk, Yellow Sunshine, and MFSB. After signing with Philadelphia International Records, as in-house songwriter/producer/arranger, he established a songwriting relationship with the lyricist Cynthia Biggs.

He also collaborated with other writers such as Bunny Sigler, T. Life, Vinnie Barrett and Kenneth Gamble. Wansel produced, wrote, arranged, played keyboards and synthesized hits for artists at Philadelphia International Records as well as numerous other labels. In 1977, he produced the Grammy-winning album Unmistakably Lou by Lou Rawls.

Wansel's music has been used as samples in the world of hip-hop. His 1975 'Theme from The Planets' drum beat intro, is hailed as being one of the first foundation beats of hip-hop. This beat continues to be sampled today and can also be heard on TV commercials and in movies. His sampled music has been used by Kanye West, Lil Wayne, Drake, Rick Ross, J Cole, Eric B and Rakim, Wiz Khalifa, Lil Kim, Ice-T and Ice Cube. In 1979 as conductor of the world-famous MFSB Orchestra, Wansel was the music director/conductor for the historic show at the White House commemorating the very first 'Black Music History Month' celebration in 1978. From 1978 through 1980, Dexter Wansel was the A+R Director for Philadelphia International Records where he oversaw many album releases by the label's artists under the direction of Gamble and Huff.  His LP Time Is Slipping Away, recorded in 1979, produced his second disco-themed hit (his first was "Disco Lights" in 1977) called "(I'll Never Forget) My Favorite Disco" co-written by Cynthia Biggs. It proved to be highly successful on the US club scene.

In 1981, he wrote and arranged the song Nights Over Egypt for the Jones Girls.

In April 2021, Wansel signed a new record deal with Digital Jukebox Records.

Personal life
Wansel is the father of Grammy-nominated music producer and songwriter Pop Wansel, and a U.S. Army Veteran of the Vietnam War era (Taiwan). He has authored a novel entitled Shortwave, published in 2011.

Dexter Wansel is the brother of author Teri Woods.

Discography

Studio albums

Singles

Selected production discography
The Jacksons - The Jacksons, 1976
Lou Rawls - All Things in Time, 1976
The Jacksons - Goin' Places, 1977
Lou Rawls - Unmistakably Lou. 1977
Lou Rawls - Let Me Be Good to You, 1979
Teddy Pendergrass - TP, 1980
Lou Rawls - Sit Down and Talk to Me, 1980
Patti LaBelle - The Spirit's in It, 1981
Grover Washington Jr. - The Best Is Yet to Come, 1982
Patti LaBelle - I'm in Love Again, 1983
Patti LaBelle - Patti, 1983
Phyllis Hyman - Living All Alone, 1986

References

External links
 
 
 
 
Dexter Wansel on Philly Soul Classics

1950 births
Living people
African-American jazz musicians
American keyboardists
Musicians from Philadelphia
Philadelphia International Records artists
21st-century African-American people
20th-century African-American people